Jon Sanders (born 1939) is an Australian yachtsman.

Jon Sanders may also refer to:
Jon Sanders (director) (born 1943), British film director

See also
John Sanders (disambiguation)
Jonathan Sanders (died 2015), Black man killed while being restrained by police in Stonewall, Mississippi, U.S.